Don Head may refer to:

 Don Head (ice hockey) (born 1933), former professional ice hockey player
 Don Head (public servant), Canadian public servant